Glacier Creek may refer to either of two streams in Alaska:
Glacier Creek (Turnagain Arm), a stream near the town of Girdwood
Glacier Creek (Tustumena), a short stream that flows from Tustumena Glacier to Tustumena Lake